Philip of the Croziermen was a 13th century Norwegian Earl and Anti-king. Along with Erling Stonewall and Ingi of the Crozier-men he was a leader of the Croziermen. He seems to have spent most of his time in Tønsberg acting as the ruler of that city during his tenure as king of the Croziermen. Sometime around 1206 AD. he was chosen to be the new king of the Crozier-men following the death of Erling Stonewall. Around 1207 he led an army to Bergen where Prince Haakon IV of Norway was staying and were going to take the castle by force but it was given to them on the advice of the Archbishop Thorir. Many of the Crozier-men thought it would be a good idea to replace Philip with Haakon (a young boy) who they could control more. Philip was not aware of these plans. Soon Philip heard that Earl Haakon the Crazy was on his way to Bergen with an army and the crozier-men decided to flee from the city. Philip departed and left Prince Haakon (the boy) with the Archbishop Thorir per his request. Some time after this he married King Sverre of Norway's daughter Lady Christine.

Earl Skule Bårdsson ruled as regent of the realm during Prince Haakon's minority. He sent out letters to various magnates and was apparently plotting against the younger Haakon. One of these letters was sent to Philip seeking friendship. Several of Haakon's courtiers sought to expose Skule, but the boy Haakon apparently did not consider him a threat.

Following the election of Haakon IV of Norway Philip sent word to Earl Skule claiming half of Norway, threatening to raise a warband if he was not given it. However his threat was never carried out because he became ill and died in Tønsberg in 1217 AD. some time between June and August.

References 

13th-century Norwegian people
Norwegian civil wars